The PP-64 Wstęga is a Polish military pontoon bridge produced since 1966. Design, based on Soviet PMP model, commenced in 1964, prototype tested in 1965. Unlike PMP, rated for 60,000 kilogram load, PP-64 was rated for 40,000 kilograms, still sufficient to carry T-54/55 and T-62 main battle tanks of its period. Jane's Military Vehicles and Logistics staff supposed that PP-64 may also be capable of supporting T-64 and T-72 tanks.

PP-64 set consists of 48 truck-mounted pontoons, 12 ramps, six motor boats (carried on twin-axle truck trailers) and other equipment. KH-200 bridging boats used with PP-64 were actually put in production later, in 1971; each is capable of carrying 15 troops. Human complement in the field reaches 126 soldiers (including 60 Star 266 truck drivers) and 10 NCOs.

Depending on the river flow and desired configuration, the PP-64 can be used to construct up to six different types of bridges of three possible roadway combinations, as well as numerous ferry configurations.

As of July, 2009, PP-64 remains in inventory of Polish Armed Forces.

References

Sources
 
 
 

Military vehicles of Poland
Military bridging equipment
Pontoon bridges